Le Bois is a former commune in the Savoie department in the Auvergne-Rhône-Alpes region in south-eastern France. On 1 January 2019, it was merged into the new commune Grand-Aigueblanche. The traditionalist Catholic order, the Fraternity of the Transfiguration, is located in Le Bois.

See also
Communes of the Savoie department

References

Former communes of Savoie